Frederick C. Cuny (November 14, 1944 – April 15, 1995) was an American humanitarian whose work spanned disaster relief, refugee emergency management, recovery from war and civil conflict as well as disaster and emergency preparedness, mitigation and peacebuilding. He was first and foremost a practitioner, but also a prolific author, an educator and a field-based researcher. He has been described as “a great American – a sort of universal Schindler, a man with lists of millions of people in Asia, Africa, Latin America and Europe whose lives he succored or saved.” Another tribute to Cuny claimed that he “was one of the world’s most accomplished disaster relief experts, both a pioneer and an iconoclast in the field of international humanitarian aid.”

Early life 
Frederick Charles Cuny was born in New Haven, Connecticut. The family moved to Lake Charles, Louisiana, and later to Dallas, Texas, when Cuny was eight, where he grew up during the early stages of the Vietnam War. He dreamed of becoming a Marine combat pilot and obtained a pilot license while still in high school. He enrolled in the military cadet program at Texas A&M University, left before graduating, and later transferred to Texas College of Arts and Industries in Kingsville. While at Kingsville, he became interested in humanitarian work after visiting low-income neighborhoods in Mexico and witnessing the plight of immigrant farm workers living in South Texas. He later attended the University of Houston where he studied urban planning and received a bachelor's degree in political science in 1967.

After graduation, he worked in the small town of Eagle Pass, Texas, on the Mexican border in a project funded under President Johnson's War on Poverty. There he developed solutions to long-standing infrastructure and public health problems. Essential to Cuny's success was his approach to grassroots participation, which later became a defining feature of his approach to humanitarian aid projects.

After Eagle Pass, "Fred" (as he was called by all who knew him) worked with the Carter and Burgess Engineering firm in Fort Worth, Texas, where he was assigned to the massive construction project of the Dallas-Fort Worth airport. Perhaps because of this experience, Cuny was often referred to as an engineer, though he had little formal engineering training. Nevertheless, his understanding of many engineering principles, his approach to planning by identifying specific problems and devising simple, practical solutions to them lent credibility to the assumption that he was an engineer.

Work in humanitarian assistance 
In 1969, Cuny experienced his first international humanitarian crisis when he traveled to Biafra, the region attempting to secede from Nigeria. “Biafra was where we first came to grips with dealing with famines, and the different ways of dealing with them—either food aid or market interventions.” Cuny observed the Nigerian government using food aid as a weapon of war, as well as the need for a more rational approach to humanitarian assistance.

After Biafra, Cuny established Intertect, a small private company dedicated to providing technical assistance, mainly to voluntary agencies (now referred to as Non-Governmental Organizations or NGOs), the US Government, and United Nations organizations. He worked as a freelance consultant, a role he played the rest of his life. From his earliest endeavors, Cuny partnered with Jean (Jinx) Parker, who became the bedrock for Cuny's Dallas office, contributing to his writings and operations and providing a home base for Cuny's far flung initiatives.

In 1970, one of the most destructive cyclones in history struck East Pakistan (now Bangladesh), killing some 300,000 people and leaving millions more homeless. The disaster was compounded several weeks later when civil war displaced 10 million East Pakistanis. Cuny was hired by the British NGO, Oxfam, to serve as an advisor in East Pakistan. He later described this assignment as life changing because it was there that he was first fully immersed in the vast, often dysfunctional machinery of the international disaster relief system, an array of international organizations, governmental agencies and NGOs.

During these early years, Cuny made a series of observations about humanitarian operations. He noticed how often bureaucracies prioritized their political agenda and that agencies routinely were unrealistic about what they could achieve. He encountered corrupt local governments misusing aid, lack of coordination, poorly designed projects, incompetence among many volunteer workers and noticed that debilitating social and political systems often grew up around aid distribution. He saw that aid was almost always too late—in part because many large aid agencies were ponderous and hide-bound by past habits—and that it was often “junk aid,” food or material sent because it was available, not necessarily what was needed. He assumed initiatives should build on the interests and perceived needs of the affected population instead of assuming that material aid should be imported. These observations contributed to his determination to change the system.

Cuny was typically unconstrained in his criticism of the humanitarian community status quo, including US government agencies, UN organizations and NGOs. But since Intertect, his consulting company, was wholly dependent on outside contracts, these entities often included the same people upon whom his livelihood depended.

Even though Cuny's career was not segmented by disaster type, the following subsections group general categories of emergencies as examples of some of his most important accomplishments.

Natural disasters 
Cuny was involved in various capacities in dozens of natural disasters. Typical projects included comprehensive needs assessments after disasters, analysis of emergency relief capabilities, pilot projects of housing reconstruction approaches and other reconstruction strategies.

Because of Cuny's work in East Pakistan in 1970-71 for Oxfam, the NGO called upon him again after the earthquake near Managua, Nicaragua in 1972. Oxfam asked him to plan a camp for the earthquake survivors. This was his first use of shelter units forming a cluster around a common space to encourage community interaction, mutual support and security, as opposed to the military model of tents in a grid of straight rows.

Appreciating Cuny's work, Oxfam immediately requested Cuny's assistance with reconstruction after the Guatemala earthquake in 1976, one of the most destructive in the history of the Western Hemisphere at the time. The most heavily affected area covered 11,500 square miles (30,000 square kilometers). Approximately 258,000 houses were destroyed, leaving 1.2 million people homeless. Oxfam, and its partner NGO, World Neighbors, asked Cuny to conceptualize a strategy for housing reconstruction. His response was a novel approach called “Programa Kuchuba’l.” In it, Cuny incorporated a high degree of citizen participation at all levels and included an educational component for both the general public and local builders, with the goal of ‘building back better.’ Cuny respected traditional construction techniques but modified them to decrease structural vulnerabilities to future earthquakes. Instead of rushing in construction materials from outside the region, he recognized that using local materials and labor could strengthen regional markets and employment opportunities. He brought to his work a continuous modeling of creative strategies for maximizing the impact of project funds.

Cuny's design and distribution of simple cartoon-like explanations of how to build safer houses using locally available materials increased the acceptance of the improved construction techniques. These field-tested illustrations could be understood by non-readers, were frequently complemented with text in the local indigenous languages and used again in Haiti and elsewhere.

When the 1986 El Salvador earthquake left over 200,000 people homeless the United States Agency for International Development Office of Foreign Disaster Assistance (USAID OFDA) hired Cuny. He devised a unique ‘big-picture’ approach to recovery, unprecedented in the US Government's approach to disaster recovery. It centered on the El Salvador government purchasing under-utilized land and building multi-family housing for disaster survivors who had been renters and squatters, a population usually overlooked by external aid organizations. Sophisticated financing and self-help construction resulted in home ownership while the collective ‘sweat equity’ increased community ties. It holistically addressed the spectrum from emergency shelter to permanent housing in a compressed timeframe, treating all survivors as stakeholders, regardless of their pre-earthquake home ownership status.

USAID OFDA subsequently requested Cuny's help after the 1988 Armenian earthquake. He surprised the US disaster chief, Julia Taft, by insisting that a higher priority for the plastic sheeting USAID had brought to provide temporary shelter for people be used instead for stabling animals, the primary asset people had left. Alternative, more effective, solutions for human shelter were then developed. This was one example of the priority Cuny placed on restoring the livelihoods of disaster survivors.

Disaster preparedness, prevention and mitigation 
Cuny recognized that there were millions of low-income families worldwide living in houses vulnerable to disasters in disaster-prone regions. With the support of the USAID OFDA, Cuny and several Intertect colleagues assessed the risks to low income residents in disaster-prone regions, developed recommendations to retrofit existing vulnerable housing, designed country-specific approaches to future disaster-resistant housing construction and prepared training materials on these topics for local builders. These projects were implemented in Haiti, Jamaica, the Dominican Republic, Dominica in the Caribbean and in the Solomon Islands, Fiji, Tuvalu in the South Pacific and in India.

Simultaneously, Cuny was the prime mover behind the implementation of three international conferences on earthen buildings in seismic areas that were held in Ankara, Turkey, Lima, Peru and Albuquerque, New Mexico, USA. These conferences brought together seismic engineers, researchers and disaster response shelter specialists who built an international network to promote safe earthen and unreinforced masonry construction. The conference proceedings became a collection of best practices on how to use these techniques in earthquake-prone areas and spawned a now-robust attention to local building practices to build earthquake resistance into low-income housing.

Refugees and displaced populations 
Cuny began developing guidelines for the design and management of camps for refugees or other displaced populations in 1970. His 1973 report on the Nicaragua camp plan and execution clearly reflects his training and skills in urban planning. He saw the camp holistically, as an integration of systems, including its layout, circulation, administration, sanitation, housing, water, lighting, recreation, organization of refugees, food distribution, waste disposal, storage and access to camp. This comprehensive overview formed the basis for his more detailed and pioneering guidelines on refugee camp planning.

In 1979, Cuny was contracted to advise on the Kampuchean refugee camp design and management in Thailand. He was able to implement the ‘community unit layout’ of camps, which integrated a sanitation/latrine solution as well as access to water into the design concept, aspects that proved fundamental to achieving public health as well as social benefits. He pioneered a series of writings and guidelines that revolutionized the thinking about how to best design refugee camps, how to keep them small and how to ensure the protection of refugees. Cuny's emphasis on social cohesion and dignity in his monographs about the layout of living areas in camps was eventually incorporated into the core principles of camp management among NGOs and the UN.

Cuny was also involved in several other refugee and displaced person operations, including Ethiopian refugees in Somalia in 1980; Palestinian refugees in Lebanon in 1982; Mozambican refugees in Zimbabwe in 1987; displaced persons in Sri Lanka from 1983 to 1988; and Ethiopian refugees in Sudan from 1984 to 1990.

Famine 
One of Cuny's earliest insights into humanitarian assistance was in Biafra in 1969, when food aid acted as a magnet to pull people from the countryside into the towns and out of the towns to the airport. Aid agencies distributed food at the airport to maximize their own efficiency, but this destabilized the population, requiring them to leave their community to obtain the life-saving aid. This destabilizing practice of distributing aid continues to this day. Cuny worked on numerous food crises and in each tried to see the longer-term picture.

UN, government and NGO disaster agencies typically have mandates and capabilities to operate in only a few domains of a crisis, such as food distribution, water supply or health. During the 1984-85 famine in Ethiopia, Cuny demonstrated to aid agencies the importance of simultaneously working across multiple sectors and domains to address root causes and solve inter-sectoral problems. He conducted assessments of famine victims who had fled to Sudan from areas of Ethiopia that were affected by protracted drought, war and famine. They settled in camps around Showak and in the UN Food and Agriculture Organization camps in eastern Sudan bordering the famine areas of Ethiopia (Tigray and Eritrea). During this period, he recognized that many of the refugees wanted and needed to return to Ethiopia to work their land, despite the prospect of government persecution. Controversially, Cuny arranged to provide food and support to many, primarily men, who chose to voluntarily repatriate ahead of the rest of their population in spite of opposition from US government and UN representatives.

In 1986, Cuny led an inter-agency assessment of food needs inside Ethiopia that included the typical review of backup supplies and food availability. However, he extended the assessment to examine dependency problems, longer-term approaches to promoting dignified livelihoods and alternative food distribution methods. A year later, this led to Cuny's involvement in an ongoing innovative venture in which large quantities of cash were taken across the border from North Sudan into Ethiopia to improve the purchasing power of the famine victims in Tigray and Eritrea. The complexities of changing currencies through third parties and the risks associated with carrying so much cash was novel for USAID.

In two of his publications, Famine and Counter-Famine Operations and Famine, Conflict and Response: A Basic Guide, Cuny articulated innovative mechanisms to monetize food assistance and to use established commercial channels to distribute food during emergency operations. Relying on existing logistical networks and markets increased the speed and cost-effectiveness of food assistance during famine, while strengthening the local economy.

As the Soviet Union was beginning to collapse in 1990, there were concerns among the international community that the breakup might lead to a possible food shortage in the new republics that might, in turn, lead to a famine. In 1992, Cuny led assessment missions to several parts of the Former Soviet Union (FSU) and was instrumental in developing the policies and approaches that the US Government later employed in assisting the states affected by the breakup.  The dissolution of the FSU continued to lead to crisis in the region.  Cuny and the Intertect team later provided assessment and planning in Mongolia, and in areas of Georgia, North Ossetia, Ingushetia, Dagestan and Chechnya  that were then at war.  Cuny reported that food distribution was in a precarious state, but still functioning and he advised against staging a food relief program.

This experience in Russia was Cuny's introduction to the region. It contributed to his interest and subsequent involvement in his final humanitarian mission.

State failure and conflict 
Most of the places where Cuny worked would today be classified as ‘fragile states:’ countries that often experience natural disasters, famine, civil conflict and/or population displacements simultaneously. As such, Cuny's analyses gradually evolved to focus on countries recovering from systemic crises.

A notable example occurred just after a ceasefire agreement in Iraq between the US and Saddam Hussein's government in 1991, when the Kurdish population in Northern Iraq misjudged the moment as an opportunity to break away from the central government. However, the Iraqi army quickly suppressed the rebellion, causing hundreds of thousands of Kurds to seek refuge in the mountains on the Iraqi-Turkey border. The situation quickly became untenable, with many people dying daily in this inhospitable, late winter environment.

The US military was called to provide humanitarian assistance but identified the problem as one of meeting the Kurds’ needs high in the mountains. Cuny was brought in to advise the US State Department and the military on how to do this. Rather than trying to support the massive population in such an unsustainable environment, Cuny proposed setting up safe zones in Northern Iraq and convincing the Kurds to return to the communities they had abandoned. But first, Cuny needed to convince two key decision-makers of his idea: the then US ambassador to Turkey, Morton Abramowitz, and the head of US military operations in Northern Iraq, Major. General Jay Garner. The concept required establishing a military coalition and humanitarian vanguard presence in Zakho in Northern Iraq in the midst of Saddam Hussein's troops and a series of warnings to the Iraqi military to withdraw. It was basically a bluff that relied on the Iraqi army's failure to foresee the consequences of establishing these safe zones.

The bluff worked. The operation was credited with saving thousands of lives, returning the Kurds to their homes in time for spring wheat harvest and planting, thereby increasing their food security during and after this crisis.

Ambassador Marc Grossman, Deputy Chief of Mission in the US Embassy in Turkey at the time, recounted his involvement with what was known as ‘Operation Provide Comfort,’ “Once we had established that safe zone in the north, just as Fred Cuny had predicted, 500,000 people went home. It was astonishing because plan B had been to set up nine or 10 massive refugee camps all along a valley in northern Iraq. Many people said that if that were the outcome, these would be the next Palestinians. Instead the Kurds went home.”

In response to a developing famine in 1992, Cuny went to Somalia to help the US government set up a food supply program. He became increasingly supportive of the novel idea of using military assets to support aid distribution. He developed a set of recommendations for military involvement, highlighting the need for it to keep a safe distance from Somalia's political hot spots and especially to avoid operating within the capital, Mogadishu, as there would be negative consequences. The ‘Cuny Plan’ was endorsed by former Ambassador Morton Abramowitz, who gave it wide circulation in Washington, including at the Pentagon and at the State Department. The Plan was ignored and Cuny was left out of further planning, though the military deployed to Mogadishu and other cities. Cuny's predictions of military and political disaster proved prescient, the low point being the ‘Black Hawk Down’ incident in October 1993, in which 18 American servicemen were killed. Coming on the heels of successful work with the military in averting a humanitarian disaster in Kurdistan, Cuny saw his inability to convince the military of the risks of their operation in Mogadishu as a major professional blow.

Protection 
Although the focus of Cuny's career in disaster management seemed to evolve from applied engineering to human rights, in fact, human rights were always central to his understanding of any emergency. He became increasingly frustrated at the international humanitarian community's shortcomings in preventing the persecution and death of civilians. This community managed to house and feed countless people but was too often unable to keep them safe. Although UN agencies and the Red Cross had implemented legal ‘protection’ using diplomatic pressure for decades, Cuny felt there was a lack of action taken on the ground – especially when hostile parties ignored the Geneva Conventions and similar legal guidelines.

Cuny contrasted diplomacy with what he called ‘practical protection.’ He and his colleague Diane Paul articulated many ideas about how external agencies can promote practical protection, such as providing secure access to sanitation facilities and adequate community lighting. A key element involved placing relief operations in strategic locations that could facilitate daily contact with aid recipients and provide a watchful eye for potential threats. Another strategy included providing external agency staff presence among the threatened population as potential witnesses and strong deterrents to human rights violations.

In the prologue to their book, Mark Frohardt et al. wrote:

"In Guatemala in 1976, Cuny witnessed how people recovering from a natural disaster had no defense from violence at the hands of their own government. Thereafter, the threat of violence figured prominently in his thinking as he responded to myriad emergencies. The larger political or military realities that might endanger those receiving assistance were always reflected in his strategies, be it in locating latrines for Ethiopian refugee women in the Sudan or in providing water for Sarajevo citizens out of the line of sniper fire. His clarity of understanding and his innovative and practical approaches to relief confirmed the need to situate assistance activities within a protection framework, broadly understood."

One of Cuny's successes in protection intervention occurred in Kuwait. In anticipation of the end of the first Gulf War, Cuny was a member of an advance USAID OFDA team based in Kuwait that planned to go into Iraq at the war's conclusion. However, the team discovered that the Kuwaiti authorities were targeting Palestinian refugee workers inside Kuwait under the allegation that these workers had expressed support for the occupying Iraqi forces. After the ‘liberation’ of Kuwait, the OFDA team's assignment was to help provide protection to the Palestinian population from bloody reprisals by Kuwaitis. Although there are reports of many Palestinians being murdered after the Kuwaiti sheikhs returned to power, Cuny and the OFDA team's intervention are credited with saving a great many Palestinian lives.

Early in the 1990s, Cuny met George Soros, a Hungarian refugee, financier and philanthropist. Soros was eager to use his considerable resources, channeled through his Open Society Fund, to bring western-style democracy to the countries of the former Soviet Union. Soros and Cuny agreed on an approach to support the encircled city of Sarajevo during the siege by Serbian forces who were committing ethnic cleansing in the surrounding countryside.

The siege had cut off Sarajevo's main supply of drinking water. Hundreds of residents were killed by Serb snipers while drawing water from the Miljacka River or from outdoor wells. One of Cuny's and his team's most remarkable achievements was to restore the city's water supply system, thus enabling much of Sarajevo's population to obtain water at home without exposing themselves to sniper fire. His complex operation entailed custom-building several water filtration components in Houston, Texas. Each component was the size of a semi-trailer and filled a massive C-130 transport airplane. All the components were flown into Sarajevo and moved to secure locations for assembly. When the filtration system started working in the summer of 1994, sniper casualties fell precipitously, and 250,000 residents gained access to running water.

Cuny also arranged to fly in planeloads of reinforced plastic pipes, fittings and regulators so local residents could tap into the city's functioning gas lines and restore home cooking and heating. Once these supplies were released by Serbian authorities, Sarajevo residents began digging trenches through the streets for the pipe to be laid, linking thousands of homes to the lines. He also brought in a team that orchestrated a collaboration between Bosnian and Serb engineers to resolve a critical disruption of natural gas into the city.

A final example of Cuny's commitment to protection involved his mission to Chechnya in 1995. Central to Cuny's objectives was the protection of some 20,000 civilians trapped in Grozny, the Chechen capital, the center of which had been bombed into a Dresden-like landscape. Cuny had hoped to find willing partners to go to Chechnya to create an ongoing international presence meant to deter Russian aggression against the civilians. Tragically, Cuny was unsuccessful when he tried to get the US government to endorse this tactic in March 1995.

Approach to his work, insights and innovations 
Think outside the box. (People frequently used this phrase to define Cuny’s approach.)

Cuny's insights led to many pioneering innovations in humanitarian assistance. He had an uncanny ability to solve disaster problems with new ideas and unique solutions. He frequently challenged the conventional wisdom of the multibillion-dollar humanitarian assistance community, which (often with the best of intentions) approached new disasters by repeating practices that were inappropriate for the situation and too often driven by political concerns.

Across the fields of disaster preparedness, response and reconstruction, Cuny's comprehensive knowledge included not only an understanding of substantial aspects of all sectors of humanitarian assistance, but also of the political, economic and social contexts that allowed or limited what could be accomplished. He came to see disasters as a manifestation of the affected society's basic problems in these areas – and that disaster assistance done properly could positively impact the original problems. He looked at the interaction between systems and used this knowledge to identify root causes of problems and to articulate solutions. Many decision-makers were influenced by his comprehensive analyses and strategic planning skills.

Instead of non-profit status, Cuny established Intertect as a private company to avoid having any limitations placed on his actions by a board of directors. He was concerned that a board might not allow him sufficient latitude for innovation, for transcending bureaucratic constraints and/or for deciding the level of risk he deemed acceptable. Even his model of for-profit consulting in humanitarian assistance was pioneering.

During the early stages of reconstruction, Cuny often saw the big picture and anticipated how to plan a community's recovery to maximize the use of aid. He was an early proponent of using reconstruction activities and investments after crises as a ‘window of opportunity’ for economic development. Cuny viewed disaster responses as opportunities to galvanize communities, to potentially strengthening their relationships with their own governments (where appropriate) and increase civic activism. He recognized that building wealth among poorer populations was critical to disaster resilience and could facilitate positive long-term social change. He also witnessed that disasters could lead to negative social change – especially in war.

Some of the principles that guided Cuny's approach to crises were to:

• keep solutions practical, typically using low-cost, local resources

• probe the root causes of the disaster or conflict, not only its manifestations, and question conventional solutions

• recognize that aid is often manipulated for tactical advantage by governments and local factions

• monitor and evaluate what works and what doesn't

In many ways, Cuny was a paradox. Many people who came to know and work with Cuny were endeared to his charm, charisma and camaraderie. Cuny was once described as having “an unassuming and energetic commitment to people in acute need." However, where his admirers saw compassion, bravery and brilliance, his critics complained of arrogance and hubris.

Again paradoxically, Cuny was extremely critical of United Nations organizations and governments, especially of the US Government. It bothered him to observe that these entities would often refrain from implementing their own mandates in the face of crises or that they would place politics above human suffering. Nonetheless, various UN organizations and the US Government itself were often his most important clients and individuals within these entities were often among his strongest supporters, or even patrons.

In his youth, Cuny sought a career in the military. But beginning with Biafra and ending in Chechnya, he dedicated his career and his life to protecting civilians caught in the maw of war. He connected what seemed to be two disparate inclinations by increasingly seeking to use military assets as a potent partner in humanitarian assistance and protection strategies.

Cuny possessed visions of greatness. As an adult, he once listed several of his life's goals. They variously included: sailing around the world, being “a man recognized and listened to by his peers, [and] a player standing at the vortex of great events.”  Nonetheless, in spite of some of his loftier goals, Cuny's Dallas-based home and lifestyle were humble, even spartan. However, he did indulge his twin passions for flying his Piper Comanche airplane and his glider. His occasional vacations usually involved being aloft.

Institution building 
Cuny valued evidence-based research that demonstrated effective approaches to disaster/emergency management and wanted to be able to pursue field-based practical research topics. To that end, he created a non-profit entity, first called Intertect Institute, later the Center for the Study of Societies in Crisis and posthumously renamed The Cuny Center.

Cuny assembled a comprehensive, unique library of literature on all aspects of disaster/refugee emergency management. In addition to hundreds of books and other publications, it included a large quantity of monographs, reports, and other unpublished documents not found in bookstores or in most libraries. The collection now resides at Texas A&M University, in the Oaktrust Digital Library, and is called The Frederick C. Cuny/INTERTECT Collection. A large portion of the collection has been digitized through a grant from USAID OFDA.

As early as the 1970s, Cuny recognized that a fundamental obstacle to the international community's ability to provide successful humanitarian assistance was the practice of staffing relief operations with well-intended but inexperienced people. He witnessed that the same mistakes made in one disaster would be repeated in the next. Cuny became convinced that the field of disaster management needed to be professionalized and capacitated. This led him to conceptualize and co-found the University of Wisconsin Disaster Management Center (DMC). In 1982, Cuny and the University convened two dozen global experts to map out the DMC's agenda and training topics.

The Disaster Management Center was the first institution to offer access to training for humanitarian workers in the field through correspondence courses (instead of through prohibitively expensive travel to remote training sites). In 1985, with the support of Don Krumm at the US State Department's Refugee Programs, the UN High Commissioner for Refugees (UNHCR) invited the DMC to develop the first technical training for their staff and implementing partners in refugee emergency management. Cuny was a key developer of the center's training materials and often presented at multi-week training events.

Many who were influenced by Cuny first encountered him in training workshops. He was a spellbinding trainer whose hour-long lectures were filled with personal anecdotes, technical acumen and clear guidelines. He aggregated the text from many of his lectures in what is basically an anthology, entitled Emergency Relief Operations for Refugees: An Overview. The model that was developed for UNHCR (custom developed training materials integrated into intensive workshops) was later adopted by many other UN agencies and NGOs and implemented through the DMC.

In 1994, Morton Abramowitz, as the president of the Carnegie Endowment for International Peace, and Cuny conceptualized the creation of a permanent organization whose mission was to assess the plight of threatened populations then to mobilize the political will necessary to ensure a meaningful response. The organization was named the International Crisis Group (ICG) and Cuny was destined to become its first director of foreign operations. Cuny was killed before he was able to assume this role, but ICG has since been active in many of the global hot spots for over two decades.

Publications 
Cuny was a prolific writer of influential books, monographs, papers and essays. The book, Disasters and Development, first published in 1983 by Oxford University Press, was his signature publication and inspired a generation of aid workers to think more methodically about what was needed in different types of natural disasters. It provided a framework for relief workers to design programs that best addressed priority needs, factoring in local capabilities and reducing vulnerability to hazards in the long term. This seminal book is still considered a landmark reference decades later, as relevant and readable today as ever.

One of the ironies of Cuny's legacy is the contrast between his reputation as a ‘cowboy,’ meant to refer to his free-willed, think-outside-the-box, making it up as he went along approach in crises, and the fact that many of the guidelines that his critics adopted were written by Cuny, such as his Assessment Manual for Refugee Emergencies for the Bureau for Refugee Programs, of the U.S. Department of State. This manual informed the USAID OFDA's set of guidelines, still in use as the Field Operations Guide, which in turn helped frame the better known Sphere Handbook: Humanitarian Charter and Minimum Standards in Humanitarian Response produced more recently by NGOs. Similarly, his early guidelines on refugee camp planning significantly influenced UNHCR's Emergency Handbook.

He wrote a series of training modules for the University of Wisconsin Disaster Management Center, including Aim and Scope of Disaster Management, Principles of Management, Disaster and Needs Assessment, Camp Planning: Principles and Examples, Logistics, Displaced Persons in Civil Conflict as well as Logistics of People Movement.

Famine, Conflict and Response: A Basic Guide, which Cuny authored with his colleague, Richard Hill, elaborated on many of his technical guidelines. Cuny recognized the reality of refugees who return home absent any formal arrangements. He dubbed this a phenomenon of ‘spontaneous return’ and documented examples of it as one of the neglected realities of refugee histories. Barry Stein, a professor at Michigan State University, also collaborated with Cuny on a series of books and papers about the factors facilitating the appropriate, well-timed repatriation of refugees back to their homes, including Refugee Repatriation During Conflict: A New Conventional Wisdom: Papers from the Conference in Addis Ababa, as well as Repatriation During Conflict in Africa and Asia and Repatriation Under Conflict in Central America.

Disappearance 
In late 1994, human rights activists became alarmed by the armed conflict in Chechnya. George Soros’s Open Society Institute asked Cuny to undertake an assessment in Chechnya to identify possible avenues of providing assistance to the besieged population. An assault by Russian troops launched on New Year's Eve transformed the Chechen capital of Grozny into a slaughterhouse. Cuny arrived five weeks later to search for a way to reduce the conflict and provide assistance to the local population.

Tens of thousands of Chechens had already fled Grozny. However, many (mainly elderly Russians) were left behind and were at grave risk of bombardment by the Russians. Cuny believed he could work with the Russian military and with Chechen rebels to evacuate the trapped population and avert a humanitarian nightmare. He hoped to use the evacuation of civilians as an excuse to broker a cease-fire.

Cuny returned to the United States in March 1995 and went public with a denouncement of Russia's brutal campaign. He wrote an article that appeared in late March in the New York Review of Books titled Killing Chechnya that was quite critical of the Russian military operation. High level US Government supporters of Cuny arranged for him to testify to officials in Washington. His briefings were passionate as he explained his plan to broker a cease-fire that could stop the killing. Cuny's objective in those briefings was to get someone in the US Government administration to intercede with the Russians so that he could help evacuate the tens of thousands civilians trapped in the battlefield. However, no one came forward to take on that role.

The war in Chechnya grew even more treacherous. Cuny returned to his base of operations in Ingushetia and on March 31, 1995, he traveled toward the deadliest region of Chechnya in a Russian ambulance with two Russian doctors and an interpreter. On April 4, Cuny and his three colleagues were captured by Chechens. His driver was released, and returned to Ingushetia with a message from Cuny saying that he was "okay" and expected to be released soon. This was the last Cuny was ever heard from. By mid-April, an alarm went out over their missing status and searches were organized by the Open Society Institute, the US Embassy in Moscow, the FBI, the CIA, the Russian FSB (the former KGB) and the Chechen military. President Bill Clinton asked Boris Yeltsin, Russia's then-prime minister, to assist with the search.

After several months of searching for Cuny, his son, Craig Cuny, and his brother, Chris Cuny, felt they had the information they needed to explain Cuny's disappearance. They received reports, believed to be reliable, that Cuny, the Russian interpreter and the two Russian doctors had all been executed near the village of Stary Atchkoi, a village controlled by the local Chechen intelligence chief.

Who ordered the execution has been debated extensively, and there are various plausible theories. One is that the Chechen intelligence chief in Stary Atchkoi had Cuny and his team killed in order to take the money they were carrying. A second theory was that the Russian FSB had arranged the killing in retaliation for Cuny's outspoken criticism of Russia's brutal handling of the war. William Burns, the American diplomat who coordinated the U.S. Embassy's search for Cuny, concluded that "Cuny was likely caught in between two intelligence services - the Chechen who pulled the trigger and the Russians responsible for setting the trap." A third theory was that the Chechen President, Dzhokhar Dudayev, had ordered their killing because Cuny may have come upon secret information about Chechnya's possible possession of nuclear war heads. If Chechnya had these war heads, they would have been stored at a former ICBM installation on the edge of the village of Bamut, within just a few kilometers of where Cuny's convoy was initially apprehended and where Cuny's passport was later reportedly found by the Russian government. The bodies of Fred Cuny, his interpreter and the two doctors have never been found.

Marriage and children 
Fred Cuny married Beth Roush Fernandez in 1966. At the time, Beth had a three-year-old daughter from a previous marriage and the two had a son together in 1967. The couple divorced after two years, with Cuny gaining custody of his son, Craig. Cuny moved to Dallas with his son and never remarried.

Legacy, awards and tributes 
Before Cuny's disappearance, when Morton Abramowitz was the president of the Carnegie Endowment, he told Samantha Power (later to become US Ambassador to the United Nations) that Cuny “is a practical man. He doesn’t just tell us ‘something must be done.’ He tells us what should be done and how we should to it. I’ve never known anybody like him.”

In an obituary honoring Cuny published in Disasters, Ian Davis (a collaborator in professionalizing the field of emergency management) wrote: “Many of us working in the same field are aware that many of our best ideas are ‘second-hand Cuny’...His cruel murder leaves a yawning gap in the leadership of international disaster management and refugee planning which will not be easily filled.”

Frontline, produced by WGBH and PBS, conducted a number of on-camera interviews to tell Cuny’s story in the 55-minute documentary The Lost American. It ran on PBS television stations on October 14, 1997. Narrated by the actor Harrison Ford, the show dwelt largely on Cuny’s final mission to Chechnya and on his personal life.

Subsequently, a 374-page book, The Man Who Tried to Save the World, by Scott Anderson, was published in 1999. It focused on telling the story of Cuny mainly as it related to his disappearance rather than on documenting the gamut of Cuny's achievements.

One of the summations of Cuny's achievements was by the author William Shawcross in his book-length review of global humanitarian aid, Deliver us From Evil: peacekeepers, warlords and the world of endless conflict, published in 2000. He dedicated a lengthy prologue to Cuny titled "The World’s Texan". Shawcross, who knew Cuny from Cambodia and Sarajevo, reflected that Cuny “was an American original. He was not a quiet American; he was a loquacious one. His life and his work epitomized the story of humanitarian endeavor.”

In 2015, Cuny's niece, Caroline Cuny, with Bryan Campbell, produced Looking for Trouble, a 22-minute documentary dedicated to the memory of Fred Cuny. The video showcases Cuny's search for solutions in war-wrecked Sarajevo and focuses on his creative water filtration and supply system.

In May 2017, the Center for Strategic and International Studies hosted an event with a panel of speakers to commemorate Cuny's insights, titling the event Disaster to Development: Building Greater Resilience. A video of this panel discussion is available online.

Cuny was named a MacArthur Fellow in 1995 but disappeared before he could officially receive his award.

In 2008, The University of Michigan created the Fred Cuny Professorship in the History of Human Rights. At the announcement of the professorship, Robert Donia, the donor who funded it, said: "Of all the people I have encountered, Fred best embodied the values of human rights and international humanitarianism."

Some of his achievements are showcased in humanitarian aid graduate courses to exemplify what one individual can accomplish through boundless creativity and ingenuity to “work the problem.”

“He performed the impossible simply because the impossible did not intimidate him.”

See also
List of people who disappeared

Bibliography 
• Anderson, Scott (1999). The Man Who Tried to Save the World. New York, Doubleday, .

• Anderson, Scott (February 25, 1996). What Happened to Fred Cuny, New York Times. Retrieved Jan. 3, 2020.

• Davis, Ian (1995) Obituary: Fred C. Cuny, 1944 – 1995. London, Disasters Vol. 20, No. 1. 

• Cuny Frederick C (1983). Disasters and Development. New York, Oxford University Press. .

• Cuny, Frederic C. Famine and Counter-Famine Operations. Dallas, Texas, Intertect. Retrieved December 29, 2019.

• Cuny, Frederick C., with Richard B. Hill (1999). Famine, Conflict and Response: A Basic Guide. Kumarian Press. .

• Cuny, Frederick C. (June 1987). Training Syllabus for the UNHCR Emergency Managers Training Workshop, Madison, Wisconsin, University of Wisconsin Disaster Management Center. Retrieved Dec. 29, 2019.

• Cuny Frederick C. Refugee Camps and Camp Planning. Report I: Camp Planning. Report II: Camp Improvements. Report III: Camp Development Programming. Report IV: Camp Layouts. Refugee Camp Planning: The State of the Art. https://oaktrust.library.tamu.edu/

• Cuny, Frederick C. (June 1987). Training Syllabus for the UNHCR Emergency Managers Training Workshop, Madison, Wisconsin, University of Wisconsin Disaster Management Center.

• Jones, Sherry (Oct 14, 1997) Frontline: The Lost American, transcript of the show. PBS. Retrieved Jan. 3, 2020.

• Jones, Sherry (Oct 14, 1997) Frontline: The Lost American, Video. PBS. Retrieved Jan. 3, 2020.

• Harrigan, Stephen (March 1985). Looking for Trouble, article in the Texas Monthly.

• Katz, Jesse (Aug. 18, 1995). Lone Ranger of Relief Aid Feared Slain in Chechnya: Disappearance: Hip-shooting humanitarian worker Fred Cuny may have run out of luck in a lawless land. Los Angeles Times.

• Kenney, George (July 8, 1999). Spy or Savior?. The Nation, Retrieved Jan. 3, 2020.

• Paul, Diane (July 1999). Protection in Practice: Field-Level Strategies for Protecting Civilians from Deliberate Harm. London, Relief and Rehabilitation Network Overseas Development Institute. Retrieved Dec. 31, 2019.

• Rudd, Gordon W. (2004). Humanitarian Intervention: Assisting the Iraqi Kurds in Operation Provide Comfort, 1991, Department of the Army 2004. Retrieved Jan. 2, 2020.

• Shawcross, William (2000). Deliver us from evil: peacekeepers, warlords and the world of endless conflict. New York, Simon & Schuster. .

• Stein, Barry N., Frederick C. Cuny (Oct. 12, 1992). Refugee Repatriation During Conflict A New Conventional Wisdom. The Center for the Study of Societies in Crisis. p. 11. Texas A&M University Libraries

References

External links 
 The Frederick C. Cuny/INTERTECT Collection, The OAKTrust Digital Repository, Texas A&M University Libraries https://oaktrust.library.tamu.edu/handle/1969.1/159819.
 www.FredCuny.info
 The International Crisis Group (http://www.crisisgroup.org/)
 Garner's Missing Link (http://archive.lewrockwell.com/orig3/kwiatkowski3.html) - about Cuny's assistance to Jay Garner in northern Iraq after the first Gulf War
 Shawcross, William (Nov. 30, 1995). A Hero of Our Time. The New York Review of Books. Reprinted with permission and included in the PBS website related to their Frontline story on Fred Cuny. Retrieved Jan. 4, 2020.

1990s missing person cases
1944 births
1995 deaths
Activists from Texas
20th-century American engineers
American humanitarians
MacArthur Fellows
Missing person cases in Russia
People from Dallas
People from New Haven, Connecticut
People of the Chechen wars